The National Order of the Ivory Coast (sometimes simply mentioned as National Order) is the highest state order of knighthood of the Ivory Coast.

History
The Order was founded on 10 April 1961 to celebrate the independence of the Ivory Coast which was until 1960 a French colony. As the highest state honour, it is awarded to those who have highly distinguished themselves to the service to the state. The collar Collar is awarded solely to foreign heads of state.

Insignia
The medal of the order is constituted of a white-enamelled cross of Malta, bordered in red, surrounded by a green crown of laurel. At the centre of the cross in a gold medallion showing a frontal elephant surrounded by a crown of laurel, the whole surrounded by a green-enamelled ring with golden inscription "REPUBLIQUE DE COTE D'IVOIRE" ("Republic of Ivory Coast").

The plaque shows the same design as the medal but the cross is put upon a silver radiating star.

The ribbon of the order is dark orange.

Grades
The Order is subdivided in five ordinary grades, plus a special class of the Collar:
 Collar
 Grand Cross
 Grand Officer
 Commander
 Officer
 Knight

Recipients 

 Affoussiata Bamba-Lamine
 Marie-Thérèse Bocoum
 Jean-Bédel Bokassa
 André Chouraqui
 Jacques Diouf
 Sadio Gassama
 Édouard Guillaud
 Gaylord Harnwell
 Jean Herly
 Festus Mogae
 Mike Moore (New Zealand politician)
 Samuel L. Myers Sr.
 Ahmadou Lamine Ndiaye
 Jacqueline Oble
 Benoît Puga
 Bernard Rogel
 Fadika Sarra Sako
 Hamad bin Khalifa Al Thani
 Nouréini Tidjani-Serpos
 Arthur Young (police officer)
 Grand Crosses
 Aga Khan IV
 Akihito
 Beatrix of the Netherlands
 Jean-Bédel Bokassa
 Elizabeth II
 Levi Eshkol
 Princess Margriet of the Netherlands
 Recep Tayyip Erdoğan
 Hamad bin Khalifa Al Thani
 Pieter van Vollenhoven

References

External links
 World Medals Index, Ivory Coast: National Order

National Order
Ivory Coast, National Order of the
1960 establishments in Ivory Coast
Awards established in 1960